Ibn al‐Bannāʾ al‐Marrākushī, full name: Abu'l-Abbas Ahmad ibn Muhammad ibn Uthman al-Azdi al-Marrakushi  (29 December 1256 – 31 July 1321), was a Marrakshi polymath who was active as a mathematician, astronomer, Islamic scholar, Sufi and astrologer.

Biography
Ahmad ibn Muhammad ibn Uthman was born in the Qa'at Ibn Nahid Quarter of Marrakesh on 29 or 30 December 1256. His nisba al-Marrakushi is in relation to his birth and death in his hometown Marrakesh. His father was a mason thus the kunya Ibn al-Banna' (lit. the son of the mason). 

Ibn al-Banna' studied a variety of subjects under at least 17 masters: Quran under the Qari's Muhammad ibn al-bashir and shaykh al-Ahdab. ʻilm al-ḥadīth under qadi al-Jama'a (chief judge) of Fez َAbu al-Hajjaj Yusuf ibn Ahmad ibn Hakam al-Tujibi, Abu Yusuf Ya'qub ibn Abd al-Rahman al-Jazuli and Abu abd allah ibn. Fiqh and Usul al-Fiqh under Abu Imran Musa ibn Abi Ali az-Zanati al-Marrakushi and Abu al-Hasan Muhammad ibn Abd al-Rahman al-Maghili who taugh him al-Juwayni's Kitab al-Irsahd. He also studied Arabic grammar under Abu Ishaq Ibrahim ibn Abd as-Salam as-Sanhaji and Muhammad ibn Ali ibn Yahya as-sharif al-marrakushi who also taugh him Euclid’s Elements. ʿArūḍ and ʿilm al-farāʾiḍ under Abu Bakr Muhammad ibn Idris ibn Malik al-Quda'i al-Qallusi. Arithmetic under Muhammad ibn Ali, known as Ibn Ḥajala. Ibn al-Banna' also studied astronomy under Abu 'Abdallah Muhammad ibn Makhluf as-Sijilmassi. He also studied medecine under al-Mirrīkh.

He is known to have attached himself to the founder of the Hazmiriyya zawiya and sufi saint of Aghmat, Abu Zayd Abd al-Rahman al-Hazmiri, who guided his arithmetic skills toward divinational predictions.

Ibn al-Banna' taught classes in Marrakesh and some of his students were: Abd al-Aziz ibn Ali al-Hawari al-Misrati (d.1344), Abd al-Rahman ibn Sulayman al-Laja'i (d. 1369) and Muhammad ibn Ali ibn Ibrahim al-Abli (d. 1356).

He died at Marrakesh on 31 July 1321.

Works
Ibn al-Banna' wrote over 100 works encompassing such varied topics as Astronomy, Astrology, the division of inheritances, Linguistics, Logic, Mathematics, Meteorology, Rhetoric, Tafsir, Usūl al-Dīn and Usul al-Fiqh. One of his works, called Talkhīṣ ʿamal al-ḥisāb (Summary of arithmetical operations), includes topics such as fractions and sums of squares and cubes. Another, called Tanbīh al-Albāb, covers topics related to:
 calculations regarding the drop in irrigation canal levels,
 arithmetical explanation of the Muslim laws of inheritance
 determination of the hour of the Asr prayer,
 explanation of frauds linked to instruments of measurement,
 enumeration of delayed prayers which have to be said in a precise order, and
 calculation of legal tax in the case of a delayed payment
He also wrote an introduction to Euclid's Elements.

He also wrote Rafʿ al-Ḥijāb 'an Wujuh A'mal al-Hisab (Lifting the Veil from Faces of the Workings of Calculations) which covered topics such as computing square roots of a number and the theory of continued fractions.

See also
Ibn Ghazi al-Miknasi

References

Sources
 
 
 
 
 
 
 

1256 births
1321 deaths
13th-century astronomers
13th-century mathematicians
13th-century Moroccan people
13th-century Moroccan writers
14th-century astronomers
14th-century mathematicians
14th-century Moroccan people
14th-century Moroccan writers
Medieval Moroccan astronomers
Astronomers of the medieval Islamic world
Medieval Moroccan mathematicians
Algebraists
Geometers
People from Marrakesh
Mathematicians who worked on Islamic inheritance
Scientists who worked on qibla determination